, also known as , is a Japanese dish of deep-fried skewered meat and vegetables. In Japanese,  refers to the skewers used while katsu means a deep-fried cutlet of meat.

Ingredients 
Kushikatsu can be made with chicken, pork, seafood, and seasonal vegetables. These are skewered on bamboo kushi; dipped in egg, flour, and panko; and deep-fried in vegetable oil. They may be served straight or with tonkatsu sauce.

 Meat
 beef (gyūniku), pork meat (butaniku) and cartilage (nankotsu), sausage, chicken parts including tsukune (minced chicken), gizzard (sunagimo), skin (torikawa), and horse meat (baniku), chicken egg and Japanese quail egg
 Seafood
 Atlantic horse mackerel (aji), Japanese smelt-whitings (kisu), shishamo smelt, wakasagi blackwater smelt, prawn and shrimp (ebi), Japanese scallop (hotate or kaibashira), oyster (kaki), octopus (tako), squid and cuttlefish (ika)
 Vegetable
 onion, egg plant (nasu), bamboo shoot (takenoko), okra, tomato, potato, sweet potato, Chinese yam (nagaimo), bell pepper (pīman), lotus root (renkon), greater burdock (gobō), pumpkin (kabocha), broccoli, asparagus, shiitake mushroom, garlic and shishito pepper
 Products and prepared
 fish products: chikuwa, hanpen and kamaboko
 dairy: hard, cream, and smoked cheeses
 prepared: bell pepper stuffed with minced pork, asparagus wrapped with bacon strips, chikuwa filled with hard cheese, mochi rice cakes, dumplings including Jiaozi (gyōza), shūmai, and beni shōga pickled ginger root colored bright pink

Geographical varieties

Osaka area 

The origin of kushiage is said to be served at food bars in downtown Osaka, in the Shinsekai neighborhood. Kushikatsu restaurants specialize in the dish. An owner of a small Shinsekai food bar since 1929 is said to be the pioneer cook, and her menu was quite popular among the district of blue collar workers. She prepared meat on skewers and deep fried, which was a kind of fast food handy to eat, not costly, and filling.

As that menu spread to other areas of Osaka and beyond, it is standard that kushikatsu are prepared with a single food not like that in Tokyo where, for example, they alternately put pork and onion on a skewer. Wider varieties of foods were prepared as the menu developed, on the contrary to those in Nagoya or Tokyo, for instance thin slices of pickled ginger or sausage by itself.

Generally speaking, the food on a skewer is smaller in Osaka style, and customers tend to order larger numbers of kushi compared to Tokyo or Nagoya. That encouraged many kushiage restaurants to use a premixed "batter flour" of powdered egg and flour (compared to that in Tokyo or Nagoya where batter is prepared with fresh egg, water and flour topped with panko crusts). High-end kushiage restaurants in Osaka serve kushikatsu in Tokyo-Nagoya style. Grated yam is added for softer texture. New types of kushikatsu restaurants serve fondue-style kushikatsu where customers fry kushi at the table in a deep pan with cooking oil. Kushinobō is a typical high-end Osaka-style kushiage restaurant with franchises across Japan, and it is appreciated for its unique serving style — until a customer informs them that they are full and don't need any more, they continue to bring variations of kushiage to their table.

Diced cabbage leaves are a free condiment prepared in a large bowl on the table, which is believed to prevent a feeling dull in the stomach.

Tokyo area 
The basic kushikatsu in Kanto eastern Japan area including Tokyo is made with diced pork rib in 3–4 cm (1.5 in) cubes, skewered with sliced onions or leeks. Battered with fresh egg, flour and thin layer of panko crust, the skewer is deep fried in vegetable oil — cottonseed, soybean, canola or rapeseed oil. At the table, skewers are seasoned with thick brown sauce, sweeter than Worcestershire sauce, with mustard if they have it in the cruet stand.

Nagoya area 

In Nagoya and its surrounding cities, they serve the local delicacy doteni, and have an option to order kushikatsu with that. Unlike the serving style in Osaka and Tokyo, in Nagoya, they dip kushikatsu in the thick sauce they grilled and sauteed beef sinew. That sauce is based on hatcho-miso, and the kushikatsu is called miso katsu.

Other varieties 
Sophisticated sauces are prepared in suburban areas of other cities including Nishinomiya and Kobe, and several sauces are served along with kushikatsu course. Plain salt, soy sauce, sesame oil and ketchup along with tartar sauce, miso, mayonnaise and other dip style sauce could be the speciality of each restaurant.

Eating manner 
Eating style is unique at kushikatu restaurants and food bars as kushikatsu is dipped into a pot of thinner sauce before eating. As a sauce pot is shared among customers, reinserting food after a bite is seen as bad manners and unsanitary. Instead, a slice of cabbage is used to scoop up sauce from the pot and pour it onto the kushikatsu. In some restaurants they put a brush or spoon at the shared pot to season the kushi.

Some kushiyaki restaurants have a menu and instructions in English and other languages to warn travelers not to dip food into the shared sauce pot after biting it.

Children's songs 
A comic kushikatsu song titled "Kushikatsu wa ippon" became popular to the generation born in 1990s as they enjoyed the song in children's song program on TV broadcast. 
 "Kushikatsuwa ippon" (Single Kushikatsu Skewer), broadcast on NHK channel
 "Daruma no Ossan no Uta - sōsu no nidozuke wa kinshi ya de" (Song dedicated to Mr. Darma - never dip your kushikatsu twice in the sauce pot)

See also

 List of deep fried foods

Notes

References

Further reading
 
 

Deep fried foods
Japanese cuisine terms
Japanese meat dishes